Dichomeris argentinellus is a moth in the family Gelechiidae. It was described by Carlos Berg in 1885. It is found in Argentina.

References

Moths described in 1885
argentinellus